Jason Drew Michaels (born May 4, 1976), nicknamed "J-Mike", is an American retired Major League Baseball outfielder. He played for the Philadelphia Phillies, Cleveland Indians, Pittsburgh Pirates, and Houston Astros.

High school and college
Born in Tampa, Florida, Michaels graduated in 1994 from Jesuit High School in Tampa, a school which also produced major leaguers Lou Piniella, Dave Magadan and Brad Radke. He batted over .400 in each of three years for Jesuit, and was selected in the 49th round of the 1994 Major League Baseball draft by the San Diego Padres. He chose not to sign and instead attended Okaloosa-Walton College, a community college in Niceville, Florida. At Okaloosa-Walton, Michaels hit .421 with 9 home runs and 45 runs batted in, and was named Panhandle Conference Player of the Year in 1996. He graduated from Okaloosa-Walton in 1996, and that year played collegiate summer baseball for the Orleans Cardinals of the Cape Cod Baseball League.

He was selected in the 44th round of the 1996 draft by the Tampa Bay Devil Rays, but he again opted not to sign and instead entered the University of Miami. He lettered in baseball for the Hurricanes in both 1997 and 1998, and was a teammate of future major-leaguers Pat Burrell and Aubrey Huff. In two seasons at Miami, he batted .396 with 34 home runs and 154 runs batted in. In 1997, he set Hurricane single-season records for hits (106), doubles (32) and total bases (189).

The St. Louis Cardinals selected Michaels in the 15th round of the 1997 amateur draft, but once again he opted not to sign, returning to Miami for his final year of eligibility. In 1998, Michaels was drafted for the fourth time when the Philadelphia Phillies selected him in the 4th round of that year's draft. He signed his first professional contract on June 19, 1998.

In 2010, Jason was inducted into the University of Miami Sports Hall of Fame.

Professional career

Philadelphia Phillies
In the Phillies farm system from 1998 through , Michaels played for the Batavia Muckdogs of the short-season, single-A New York–Penn League (1998), the Clearwater Phillies (now Clearwater Threshers) of the advanced single-A Florida State League, the Reading Phillies of the double-A Eastern League and the Scranton/Wilkes-Barre Red Barons of the triple-A International League (2001). In 424 minor league games with the Phillies, he hit .282 with 52 home runs and 264 RBI.

Although he spent most of the season with Scranton/Wilkes-Barre, Michaels made his major league debut with Philadelphia on April 6, 2001. He was on the Phillies' 25-man roster from  through  as a reserve outfielder and pinch hitter, compiling a .291 batting average with 21 home runs and 100 RBI in 383 games and 808 at bats. In , he was the team's fourth outfielder behind fellow University of Miami alumnus Pat Burrell, Marlon Byrd, and Bobby Abreu. In 2005, he platooned in center field with left-handed hitting Kenny Lofton.

Cleveland Indians
On January 27, 2006, the Phillies traded Michaels to the Cleveland Indians for left-handed relief pitcher Arthur Rhodes. This trade precipitated a second deal in which the Indians sent outfielder Coco Crisp, relief pitcher David Riske and catcher Josh Bard to the Boston Red Sox in exchange for reliever Guillermo Mota, third baseman Andy Marte, catcher Kelly Shoppach, Randy Newsom and cash. Michaels replaced Crisp in left field for the Indians in 2006, hitting primarily in the second spot in the batting order behind Grady Sizemore. For the season, he hit .267 with nine home runs and a career-best 55 RBI. He missed 16 games after crashing into the outfield wall at Yankee Stadium on June 15.

Michaels's struggles against right-handed pitching in 2006 (.252, 4 HR, 28 RBI in 338 plate appearances compared to .291, 5 HR, 27 RBI in 210 plate appearances against left-handers) prompted the Indians to sign left-handed hitting, free agent outfielder David Dellucci after the 2006 season.

Roberto Clemente Award Nominee
On September 6, 2006, the Indians announced that Michaels was their nominee for the prestigious Roberto Clemente Award, given annually to the major league player who best exemplifies a commitment to community service.
Michaels donated the $2,500 award to the Cleveland chapter of Gang Resistance Education and Training.

Pittsburgh Pirates
On May 8, 2008, Michaels was traded to the Pittsburgh Pirates after being designated for assignment.

Houston Astros
On December 15, 2008, Michaels was signed to a one-year, $750K contract by the Astros.

Michaels re-signed with the Astros the following year.

On October 4, 2010, the Astros exercised a $900,000 club option for 2011. Michaels had batted .253 with 26 RBI and appeared in 106 games.

Washington Nationals
The Washington Nationals signed Michaels to a minor league contract on December 16, 2011.

Personal life
Michaels's grandfather, John Michaels, pitched for the  Boston Red Sox
and also played in the Cincinnati Reds organization. His father, Earl Michaels, played quarterback for the West Virginia Tech football team. His cousin, Jacob Watters, was chosen in the 2022 MLB draft.

Jason now runs a baseball clinic in Tampa Florida called The Big League Approach as described in a recent interview with William Slover of Pain Resource

References

External links

1976 births
Living people
Batavia Muckdogs players
Clearwater Phillies players
Reading Phillies players
Scranton/Wilkes-Barre Red Barons players
Buffalo Bisons (minor league) players
Oklahoma City RedHawks players
Syracuse Chiefs players
Major League Baseball left fielders
Baseball players from Tampa, Florida
Miami Hurricanes baseball players
Northwest Florida State Raiders baseball players
Orleans Firebirds players
Philadelphia Phillies players
Cleveland Indians players
Pittsburgh Pirates players
Houston Astros players
Jesuit High School (Tampa) alumni